Ten Mile Creek Bridge (No. 01181) is a Conde McCullough-designed bridge near Yachats in Lane County in the U.S. state of Oregon. It was listed on the National Register of Historic Places in 2005.

The bridge carries U.S. Route 101 over Tenmile Creek. McCullough designed the structure in 1931. Ornate precast concrete railings run along the sides.

See also

List of bridges documented by the Historic American Engineering Record in Oregon
List of bridges on the National Register of Historic Places in Oregon
List of bridges on U.S. Route 101 in Oregon

References

External links

Road bridges on the National Register of Historic Places in Oregon
Neoclassical architecture in Oregon
Art Deco architecture in Oregon
Bridges completed in 1931
National Register of Historic Places in Lane County, Oregon
Historic American Engineering Record in Oregon
Bridges by Conde McCullough
1931 establishments in Oregon
U.S. Route 101
Bridges of the United States Numbered Highway System
Concrete bridges in the United States
Tied arch bridges in the United States
Bridges in Lane County, Oregon